Chaitén is a volcanic caldera  in diameter,  west of the elongated ice-capped Michinmahuida volcano and  northeast of the town of Chaitén, near the Gulf of Corcovado in southern Chile. The most recent eruptive phase of the volcano erupted on 2008. Originally, radiocarbon dating of older tephra from the volcano suggested that its last previous eruption was in 7420 BC ± 75 years. However, recent studies have found that the volcano is more active than thought. According to the Global Volcanism Program, its last eruption was in 2011.

Two small lakes occupied the caldera floor on the west and north sides of the lava dome.

2008 eruption
The Chaitén volcano entered a new eruptive phase for the first time since around 1640 on the morning of May 3, 2008. The
Chilean government began an evacuation of the nearby town of Chaitén (population 4,200) and the surrounding area the same day, the main phase of which was completed by May 3, 2008. One elderly person died while at sea en route to Puerto Montt.

A team of scientists from the US was dispatched to the area to assess the air quality and the risks from chemicals in the falling ash.

The initial phase of the actual eruption in 2008 was characterised by ash emissions and seismic activity; local seismic measurements in 2005 registered earthquakes up to magnitude 3.6 MW below the Chaitén volcano. On May 6, 2008, the force of eruption increased significantly, producing pyroclastic flows and possibly some lava explosions, and raising the eruption column to a height of perhaps . The remaining personnel and almost all inhabitants of Chaitén and nearby villages were evacuated, as was Futaleufú.

In the early phase of the eruption (May 2, 2008), two separate vents had developed in the old lava dome. OVDAS warned of possible major pyroclastic incidents, and the likelihood of prolonged activity.

On May 8, 2008, the government said it would force the last residents from the danger area, but this was later legally challenged by some residents and left to no effect by the Supreme Court. Government personnel later returned to attend to livestock and rescue dogs and other animals.

Through the remainder of May and June 2008 the eruption continued as a variable but gradually decreasing emission of ash, with intermittent seismic activity and pyroclastic flows. On May 21, a new lava dome was observed to be forming in the crater, which by May 24 exceeded the height of the old dome. Initially, the dome extended towards the north side of the caldera, but following the emergence of two new vents in the south of the old dome around June 11 and a later one to the west, the expansion moved to the south, eventually blocking the drainage from the caldera floor.

Whether the dome will be stable remains uncertain, and there is an ongoing risk of collapse and explosive pyroclastic eruption.
In August 2008, an expedition reached the summit of Chaiten volcano. Earthquakes were felt at the summit. The lava dome was loudly degassing, and avalanches of lava boulders fell from the dome side to the crater floor.

The ash once again reached Futaleufú and parts of Chubut province in neighboring Argentina. The approximately 160 people that were in Chaitén were strongly urged to leave, and all but 25 people who refused to leave were evacuated that day.

Damage
Forests near the volcano have been burned by pyroclastic flows and lateral explosions. Large parts of southern Argentina and Chile have been coated with ash, with possible longer term consequences for agriculture, although not only negative as ash adds new minerals to the soil. Large amounts of ash have fallen in some areas, posing a risk of lahars for several communities.

Beginning on May 12, lahars caused flooding in the town of Chaitén, depositing ash mud to a depth of up to a metre or more, damaging many buildings, and completely filling the original course of the Chaitén River past the town. Over the subsequent weeks, the river excavated a new course through Chaitén, completely destroying a significant part of it by July 2008. Some defensive work has been undertaken by the government. The town of Chaiten is slowly recovering. Its current population is about 900 people.

Rarity
This eruption is known as the first major explosive eruption of rhyolite magma in nearly a century, since the 1912 eruption of Novarupta, in Alaska. Although there have been rhyolitic eruptions in the southern section of the Southern Volcanic Zone in the past, these are relatively scarce and there is no historic rhyolitic eruption of the magnitude of Chaitén.

References

External links

Articles
 BBC News: In pictures: Chile volcano erupts
 Chaiten Volcano Still Active - The Big Picture - Boston.com
 Dagbladet: Vulkanen blir sintere 
 SERNAGEOMIN 
 TerraDaily: Chilean volcano turns Chaiten into ghost town
 The Volcanism Blog - Chaitén
 Chaiten Volcano - John Seach
 The story of how Chaitén volcano was discovered 

Scientific Papers on the Chaitén eruption
 A Folch et al., 2008, Volcanic ash forecast – application to the May 2008 Chaitén eruption, Nat. Hazards Earth Syst. Sci., 8, 927-940
 LE Lara, 2009, The 2008 eruption of the Chaitén volcano: a preliminary report, Andean Geology 36, 125-129
 SFL Watt et al., 2009, Fallout and distribution of volcanic ash over Argentina following the May 2008 explosive eruption of Chaiten, Chile, Journal of Geophysical Research (Solid Earth) 114, B04207
 M Reich et al., 2009, Formation of cristobalite nanofibers during explosive volcanic eruptions, Geology 37, 435-438

Photography
 BBC, November 1, 2008, Alert at smoking Chile volcano
 Images and videos of current eruption 
 Region de los Lagos regional government photographs of the emergency. 
 Image gallery 

Webcams
 Chaitén caldera webcam (Southern Andean Volcano Observatory)

Mountains of Chile
Active volcanoes
Calderas of Chile
Volcanic crater lakes
Volcanoes of Los Lagos Region
South Volcanic Zone
21st-century volcanic events
Holocene calderas